Zalimkhan Yusupov (born 19 February 1984 in Makhachkala) is a Russian born-Dagestani Tajikistani freestyle wrestler. He competed in the freestyle 66 kg event at the 2012 Summer Olympics; after defeating Alan Gogayev in the qualifications, he was eliminated by Haislan Garcia in the 1/8 finals.

References

External links
 

1984 births
Living people
Tajikistani people of Dagestani descent
Olympic wrestlers of Tajikistan
Wrestlers at the 2012 Summer Olympics
Sportspeople from Makhachkala
Asian Games medalists in wrestling
Wrestlers at the 2014 Asian Games
Tajikistani male sport wrestlers
Asian Games silver medalists for Tajikistan

Medalists at the 2014 Asian Games